Gao Huaide (高懷德) ( 926 – 982) courtesy name Cangyong was a general in ancient China, first in the Later Zhou military and later in the Northern Song military.

Life
Gao Huaide's father Gao Xingzhou was a general in the Later Zhou military. In 944, just 18 years old, Gao Huaide accompanied his father in resisting the invasion by the Liao forces from the north. In Qicheng (near today's Puyang, Henan Province), his father was surrounded by the Liao forces and with no aid in sight, Gao Huaide fought a way out and saved his father on his horseback.

In 957, the Later Zhou military tried to invade Shouchun (in today's Shou County, Anhui Province) which was occupied by Southern Tang kingdom. At night, Gao Huaide and a few men went across the Huai River for reconnaissance and in the morning caught a Southern Tang soldier who provided important information. When Emperor Shizong of Later Zhou watched the battle from a height, he noticed a general who fought many enemies by himself, even taking the spear from the enemy's hands. He was informed that was Gao Huaide.

When Later Zhou was overthrown by the Song Dynasty, Emperor Taizu of Song arranged for Gao Huaide to marry his younger sister, Princess Chang of Yan Kingdom. Along with Shi Shouxin, Gao Huaide defeated Li Yun's rebellion.

References

  Toqto'a et al., History of Song, vol. 250 (Gao Huaide)

920s births
982 deaths
Later Zhou people
Song dynasty generals